was the 7th daimyō of Odawara Domain in Sagami Province, (modern-day Kanagawa Prefecture) in mid-Edo period Japan. His courtesy title was Kaga no Kami.

Biography
Tadazane was born in Edo in 1782 (some sources state 1778) as the son of the 6th daimyō of Odawara, Ōkubo Tadaaki. He succeeded to headship of the Ōkubo clan and Odawara Domain upon his father’s death in 1796.

During his tenure, he reformed the domain's faltering finances, particularly through his employment of the scholar Ninomiya Sontoku, who reformed the domain's taxes and encouraged development of agriculture through immigration from other domains. In 1800, Tadazane had his start in the Tokugawa administration as a Sōshaban, or Master of Ceremonies. Four years later, on 28 January 1804, he was appointed to the concurrent position of Jisha-bugyō (Magistrate of Temples and Shrines). On 25 June 1810, he became Osaka Castellan, followed by the post of Kyoto Shoshidai from 16 April 1815. As was usually the case with holders of the latter office, Tadazane became a Rōjū under the shōgun Tokugawa Ienari upon the completion of his duties in 1818 (having been recommended by Matsudaira Sadanobu). He died 19 years later, while still holding the office of Rōjū, in 1837. His grave is at the clan temple of Saisho-ji in Setagaya, Tokyo.

Tadazane was married to a daughter of Hachisuka Haruaki, daimyō of Tokushima Domain, but his only son and heir Ōkubu Tadanaga died in 1831. He adopted Tadanaga's son, Tadanao as his heir.

References 
 Papinot, Edmond. (1906) Dictionnaire d'histoire et de géographie du japon. Tokyo: Librarie Sansaisha...Click link for digitized 1906 Nobiliaire du japon (2003)
 The content of much of this article was derived from that of the corresponding article on Japanese Wikipedia.

External links 
 Odawara on "Edo 300 HTML" (25 October 2007)

|-

Tadazane
1782 births
1837 deaths
Fudai daimyo
Rōjū
Kyoto Shoshidai
People from Tokyo
Place of death missing